The GRAI method, GRAI is short for  Graphs with Results and Actions Inter-related, and the further developed GRAI Integrated
Methodology (GIM) is a modeling method of Enterprise modelling. 

The GRAI method was first proposed by Guy Doumeingts  in his 1984 PhD thesis, entitled La Méthode GRAI, further developed at the GRAI/LAP (Laboratory of Automation and Productics) of University Bordeaux I, and followed by GRAI/GIM by Doumeingts and others in 1992. 

The GRAI method can represent and analyze the operation of all or part of a production activity. The strength of the GRAI method lies in its ability to provide modelers can effectively model the decision-making system of the company, i.e. organizational processes that generate decisions.

In the GRAI methodology four types of views had been incorporated: the functional view, physical view, decisional view and informational systems view.

References

Further reading 
 Chen, D., and G. Doumeingts. "The GRAI-GIM reference model, architecture and methodology." Architectures for Enterprise Integration. Springer US, 1996. 102-126.
 Chen, David, Bruno Vallespir, and Guy Doumeingts. "GRAI integrated methodology and its mapping onto generic enterprise reference architecture and methodology." Computers in industry 33.2 (1997): 387-394.
 Doumeingts, Guy, Bruno Vallespir, and David Chen. "GRAI grid decisional modelling." Handbook on architectures of information systems. Springer Berlin Heidelberg, 1998. 313-337.
 Doumeingts, Guy. "How to decentralize decisions through GRAI model in production management." Computers in Industry 6.6 (1985): 501-514.
 Girard, Philippe, and Guy Doumeingts. "GRAI-Engineering: a method to model, design and run engineering design departments." International Journal of Computer Integrated Manufacturing 17.8 (2004): 716-732.

External links 
 The GRAI Method Part 1: global modelling by B. Vallespir, G. Doumeingts
 The GRAI method Part 2: detailed modeling and methodological issues by B. Vallespir, G. Doumeingts
Enterprise modelling